The 1890 Columbian Orange and Blue football team was an American football team that represented Columbian University (now known as George Washington University) as an independent during the 1890 college football season. The Orange and Blue had a 2–3 record with no head coach. It was their first season since 1883 and their last before 1895.

Schedule

References

Columbian
George Washington Colonials football seasons
Columbian Orange and Blue football